Craigavon Area Hospital is a teaching hospital in Portadown, Craigavon, County Armagh, Northern Ireland. It serves an estimated 241,000 people from the boroughs/districts of Craigavon, Banbridge, Armagh and Dungannon–South Tyrone. It is managed by the Southern Health and Social Care Trust and is located within the townland of Lisnisky, beside the A27 road, at the north-eastern edge of Portadown.

History
The hospital, which was commissioned to take on acute services previously carried out at Carleton House, Lurgan Hospital and Banbridge Hospital, opened in 1972. In February 2003 the hospital was designated as one of the nine acute hospitals in the acute hospital network of Northern Ireland on which healthcare would be focused under the government health policy 'Developing Better Services'.

It was granted University Teaching Hospital status by Queen's University Belfast in June 2011 and a new pediatric ward, built at a cost of £7 million, opened in October 2017.

References

External links

Southern Health and Social Care Trust
Hospital buildings completed in 1972
Teaching hospitals in Northern Ireland
Health and Social Care (Northern Ireland) hospitals
Buildings and structures in County Armagh
Hospitals established in 1972
1972 establishments in Northern Ireland
Hospitals in County Armagh